Macrocamptus is a genus of longhorn beetles of the subfamily Lamiinae, containing the following species:

 Macrocamptus andamanicus (Gardner, 1930)
 Macrocamptus virgatus (Gahan, 1890)

References

Dorcaschematini